Sirens is the debut studio album by American heavy metal band Savatage, released on April 11, 1983. The music on this album is heavier than in later Savatage albums, where the band developed their own style of progressive metal.

According to frontman Jon Oliva, Sirens and the long EP The Dungeons Are Calling were recorded and mixed all in one day. With most of the songs prepared no more than a week before the recording session, the band could only afford one day in the studio. The two albums together were to make Savatage's debut but since vinyl records limited the total running time, they were divided. In 2011, they were remastered and released together on the label Earmusic.

The cover of the English versions published by both Music for Nations and Combat Records in 1985 used the cover of the children's book The Borribles Go for Broke. It was also used by Metal Blade Records for the first edition on CD and other subsequent versions.

Track listing

The track "Out on the Streets" was later re-recorded by the band on their 1986 album, Fight for the Rock and an acoustic rendition was recorded by Jon Oliva and included as bonus track in the 2010 Greatest Hits.
The track "Lady in Disguise" was also later re-recorded for the 1986 album, Fight for the Rock, but with different arrangements.
The track "Scream Murder" was covered on American progressive metal band Vanquishes' album Speed Metal Demon.
 The track "Holocaust" was covered by American death metal band Six Feet Under and is featured on their cover album Graveyard Classics

Personnel
Savatage
Interesting to note is that in the liner notes for the album, they gave themselves roles instead of listing their instruments.
Jon Oliva – Shrieks of Terror (lead vocals)
Criss Oliva – Metalaxe (guitars, backing vocals)
Keith Collins – The Bottom End (bass, backing vocals)
Steve Wacholz – Barbaric Cannons (drums, percussion)

Production
Danny Johnson – producer
Jim Morris – engineer
Mike Fuller – mastering
The Music Connection - album coordination
Jeffrey S. King – US edition artwork
Terry Oakes – UK edition artwork, illustrations
Eddy Schreyer – re-mastering

Charts

References

External links
Sirens entry at official Savatage homepage

1983 debut albums
Music for Nations albums
Savatage albums
Albums recorded at Morrisound Recording